The Lefever Arms Company (1883–1916) was a manufacturer of guns in Syracuse, New York founded by Daniel Lefever. The company was in the business of gun manufacture until 1916, when it merged with Ithaca Gun Company in Ithaca, New York, which continued Lefever production until 1921.

By 1912, the company ventured into the manufacture of transmissions and jackshafts for motor wagons. This subsidiary was merged with the Durston Gear Company in 1916.

Advertisements

See also 
 Union Automatic Revolver

References

External links 
 Lefever Arms Collectors Association website

Defunct companies based in Syracuse, New York
Manufacturing companies established in 1883
Manufacturing companies disestablished in 1916
Manufacturing companies based in Syracuse, New York
1883 establishments in New York (state)
1916 disestablishments in New York (state)
1916 mergers and acquisitions